Sinderby is a village and civil parish in the Hambleton district of North Yorkshire, England. Sinderby is located 223 miles (358.8 km) north of London and 48 miles (77.2 km) south of Durham, just east of the A1(M) motorway offering road links to larger cities such as Leeds, London and the Channel Ports. It has a population of 142 people according to the 2001 census, reducing to 137 at the 2011 census and is part of the district of Hambleton.

Village
The village of Sinderby is a rural community, consisting of mainly residential housing with detached and semi detached housing, as well as small companies and farms, such as Manor Farm; an egg merchants. It also comprises a village hall which resides beside the village green which dates back from the 1990s,

History
The parish had a small Wesleyan chapel that was built in 1835, and in a field called chapel field, adjoining the village of Sinderby, there have been signs and indications of there being a chapel in 1848. Old parishes tended to form at a time when there were little difference between the church and the state according to the local people. Sinderby was a township up until 1866 when it became a civil parish, much like many townships that around the same time either became included into other civil parishes, or created their own.

In 1590, an estate of 21 acres of land was given to the All Saints church located in Pickhill, thought to be erected some 700 years prior to 1890, and it was restored in 1877 at a cost of £3,000. Sinderby was part of the Pickhill parish in 1890, along with other townships including Roxby, Ainderby-Quernhow, Holme, Howe and Swainby-with-Allerthope. It comprises 542 acres of land which was chiefly owned by Mr. William Dunning, Mrs. M. Hammond and Miss. M. Kendrew. Kendrew who purchased the manorial rights and 50 acres of land from her cousin, Mr. William Wilson in 1882 for £3,000.

 railway station was opened on 2 June 1852 initially having one low platform, and in 1901 a second platform was added. Upon its opening the station had two employees who were Henry Bell who was the stationmaster, and Jas Elliot who worked as a porter. On 1 January 1962 the station was closed to passengers, and little under two years later on 11 November 1963 the station was closed completely. From December 2002 a number of British Railways Mark 2 coaches were stored behind the station for a period of time unused, and this evolved into the famous "Sinderby train graveyard" until they were removed in 2009 before the widening of the A1 road.

Demographics

Population

The first recorded census of Sinderby occurred in 1881 with the population being 114 people. A census was carried out every ten years up until 1961, offering information on such statistics as total population, population change, gender and area over the time the census has been carried out. The population in the parish stayed roughly the same until 1911 when it drastically decreased to 92 people, possibly being due to the First World War. This fluctuation appeared again between 1931 and 1961, with the census data showing the population in 1931 being 107 people and then rapidly declining up until 1961 when the population was as low as 80 people according to census records. There are no census records from 1941 due to the Second World War. From 1961 onwards the census data changed, listing the information gathered in some places by wards and no longer by parishes.

According to the 2001 census, the headcount of the parish of Sinderby was 142 people, and the male:female ratio is split almost perfectly, with there being 70 males and 72 females residing in 55 households. The parish consists of mainly families, with 31 people being aged between 5–15 years old and 49 people aged between 25 and 44 years old.

Occupation structure

The 1881 census on inhabitants occupations provides information on what occupational category the population of Sinderby fall into. The data shows that the large proportion of males worked in agriculture, with 13 of the 31 males falling into this category. The rest of the male population were employed across a variety of different jobs, including transport, food and lodging and animals. In contrast, almost all females were without specific occupations, with 25 of the 31 being part of this category. However, a small minority of the female population worked in domestic services or office work.

In 2001 the number of people employed was 98, with 76 of these people being economically active. Over half of those employed are males, and the average distance travelled to work is around 25 km, showing how it is necessary for them to migrate to more urban areas in search of work.

Transport

Road
Sinderby is accessible through a range of lanes such as Sinderby Lane, Lime Lane and Westfield Lane that connect to the A1(M) motorway and the B6267 offering access to the parish by car. The newly opened A6055 provides express links from Sinderby towards the Harrogate and Ripon metropolitan areas.

Public Transport
There are also 7 bus routes serving Sinderby; the 147 and the 149 bus offering transport to nearby towns such as Pickhill and Thirsk. The other five bus routes are for school services offering transport to schools such as Thirsk School and Pickhill CE School. There is a popular car sharing scheme in Sinderby, employed predominantly at weekends for seaside visits.

Train
Sinderby itself doesn't have a designated railway station after the closure of the previous one in 1963. Instead residents use nearby railway stations such as the one located in Thirsk.

References

External links

Villages in North Yorkshire
Civil parishes in North Yorkshire